Stream of consciousness is a narrative mode used in literature.

Stream(s) of Consciousness may also refer to:

Music
 Stream of Consciousness (album), by Vision Divine, 2004
 Stream of Consciousness, an album by Still Time, or the title song, 2007
 Streams of Consciousness, an album by Max Roach and Dollar Brand (Abdullah Ibrahim), 1977
 "Stream of Consciousness" (instrumental), by Dream Theater, 2003
 "Stream of Consciousness", a song by Kreator from Extreme Aggression, 1989
 "Stream of Consciousness", a song by Textures from Drawing Circles, 2006

Other uses
 Stream of consciousness (psychology), a concept in psychology
 "Stream of Consciousness" (The Outer Limits), a television episode

See also
 Consciousness (disambiguation)